Daniel Feraud (born 15 November 1953) is an Argentine épée and foil fencer. He competed at the 1972 and 1976 Summer Olympics. Son of Roberto Eduardo Jose Feraud.

References

1953 births
Living people
Argentine male foil fencers
Argentine male épée fencers
Olympic fencers of Argentina
Fencers at the 1971 Pan American Games
Fencers at the 1972 Summer Olympics
Fencers at the 1976 Summer Olympics